is a train station in Mine, Yamaguchi Prefecture, Japan.

Lines 
West Japan Railway Company
Mine Line

Surroundings 
 Roadside Station Ofuku
 Japan National Route 316

Railway stations in Japan opened in 1920
Railway stations in Yamaguchi Prefecture